Ya'qub ibn Ibrahim al-Ansari, better known as Abu Yusuf (d.798) was a student of jurist Abu Hanifa (d.767) who helped spread the influence of the Hanafi school of Islamic law through his writings and the government positions that he held.

He served as the chief judge (qadi al-qudat) during reign of Harun al-Rashid. Kitab al-Kharaj, a treatise on taxation and fiscal issues facing the state, is his most well-known publication.

Biography

Abu Yusuf lived in Kufa and Baghdad, in what is now Iraq, during the 8th century. His genealogy has been traced back to Sa'd ibn Habta, a youth in Medina in the time of the Prophet, and his birth date is estimated based on the date of his death to be around 113/729CE.

Based on anecdotal stories, Abu Yusuf was raised poor but with a ferocious appetite for knowledge. His mother disapproved of his academic desires, insisting that he master some trade (the art of tailoring, according to some source) so as to help make ends meet. While it cannot be fully verified, stories suggest that he complied with his mother's wishes, but also kept up his academic studies. His talent and commitment was eventually recognized by Abu Hanifa who became his mentor with Abu Yusuf as his star pupil. He is portrayed as an incredibly studious individual who was unceasing in his pursuit for knowledge and legal understanding. While much of what is known of his early childhood relies on sometimes contradictory anecdotal evidence, it has been verified that he studied religious law and traditions in Kufa and Medina under a number of scholars including Abu Hanifa, Malik b. Anas, al-Layth b. Sa'd and others. Under the guidance of Abu Hanifa, Abu Yusuf achieved incredible success and helped develop and spread the influence of the Hanafi school of Islamic law.

Abu Yusuf lived in Kufa until he was appointed Qadi in Baghdad. It is unclear whether he was appointed by Mahdi, al-Hadi, or Harun al-Rashid. According to one story, Abu Yusuf was able to provide sound advice pertaining to religious law to a government official who rewarded him generously and recommended him to the caliph, Harun al-Rashid. He continued to provide satisfactory legal opinions to the caliph who drew him into his inner circle and eventually appointed him Qadi. While this version of events is probable, it is not necessarily authentic and cannot be independently verified. What is known is that Abu Yusuf became a close acquaintance of Abbasid caliph, Harun al-Rashid, who eventually granted him the title of Grand Qadi, or Qadi 'l-qudat; the first time such a title had been conferred upon someone in Islamic history. While at the time it was meant as an honorific title, the Caliph frequently consulted Abu Yusuf on legal matters and financial policy and even bestowed upon him the ability to appoint other Qadis in the empire. This made the position of Grand Qadi analogous to a modern-day chief justice. Abu Yusuf held the position of Grand Qadi until his death in 182/798CE.

Literary works
During his lifetime, Abu Yusuf created a number of literary works on a range of subjects including Islamic jurisprudence, international law, narrations of collected traditions (ahadith), and others. The Kitāb al-Fihrist, a bibliographic compilation of books written in the 10th century by Ibn al-Nadim, mentions numerous titles authored by Abu Yusuf. With one exception, none of these works listed in the Fihrist have survived. The exception is his book entitled Kitāb al-Kharāj, a treatise on taxation and financial issues facing the empire written at the request of the caliph, Harun al-Rashid. The Islamic empire was at the height of its power at the time of his writing and in his treatise, he sought to advise the caliph on how to appropriately conduct financial policies in accordance with religious law. While the caliph took some suggestions and ignored others, the overall effect was to limit the ruler's discretion over the tax system. A selection of other works credited to him that do not appear in the Fihrist have also survived. The Kitab al-Athar is a collection of Kufian traditions (ahadith) which he narrated. Kitab Ikhtilaf Abi Hanifa wa Ibn Abi Layla is a comparison of the opinions between the legal authorities, Abu Hanifa and Abu Layla. Kitab al-Radd ‘Ala Siyar al-Awza’i is a "reasoned refutation with broad systematic developments," of the opinions regarding the laws of war of the famous Syrian scholar, al-Awza’i. Some excerpts from his various other works that have not survived in their totality were incorporated in texts written by his disciples and were passed on through succeeding generations. For example, excerpts from Abu Yusuf's book, Kitabal-Hiyal (Book of Legal Devices) were incorporated in the book, Kitabal-Makharidj fi 'l-Hiyal written by his disciple, Muhammad al-Shaybani.

Doctrine and Methodology

As a disciple of Abu Hanifa, Abu Yusuf's doctrine largely presupposes that of his mentor. His writings and prominent political positions helped advance the Hanafi school of Islamic law throughout the Islamic empire. While most of his legal opinions (fatwas) were firmly rooted in the doctrine and methodology espoused by his former teacher, there are some points on which he diverged and revealed his own legal thought. Abu Yusuf's greatest legacy is in affirming and advancing the Hanafi legal school as the predominant source of legal thought in the Islamic empire and providing a legal framework for defining and restricting caliphal authority in regard to fiscal policy.

List of works
Kitab al-Kharaj, his most famous work, is a treatise on taxation and fiscal problems of the state prepared for the caliph.
Usul al-fiqh - the earliest known work of principles of Islamic jurisprudence. A portion of his works were devoted to international law.
Kitab ul-Aathar, a collection of traditions (ahadith) he narrated.  
Kitab Ikhtilaf Abi Hanifa wa Ibn Abi Layla, one of the early works on comparative fiqh
Kitab al-Radd ‘Ala Siyar al-Awza’i, a refutation of the famous Syrian jurist and tradition, al-Awza’i on the law of war.  These 3 books were published by Al Ihya Al Ma'arif an N'omaniya under the guidance of Abul Wafa Al Afghani

Early Islam scholars

See also
Islamic scholars
Muhammad al-Shaybani
Sharia
List of Islamic scholars described as father or founder of a field

References

Year of birth unknown
798 deaths
Hanafi fiqh scholars
Sunni Muslim scholars of Islam
8th-century Muslim scholars of Islam
8th-century people from the Umayyad Caliphate
Chief qadis of the Abbasid Caliphate
8th-century people from the Abbasid Caliphate
One Thousand and One Nights characters
8th-century jurists
8th-century Arabs
Taba‘ at-Tabi‘in hadith narrators